Ben Rice (born 1972) is a prize-winning British author.

Rice was born in Tiverton, Devon, educated at Blundell's School and read English literature at Newcastle University, Wadham College, Oxford before undertaking a creative writing course at the University of East Anglia (MA).

His debut novella Pobby and Dingan (later filmed as Opal Dream) was awarded the Somerset Maugham Award in 2001 (as well as being shortlisted for the John Llewellyn Rhys Prize), and in 2003 Granta named him as one of their twenty "Best of Young British Novelists". Pobby and Dingan  has been described as ' ... an enormously touching, imaginative and unexpected novel that ... glows in your hands.' (Jeff Giles, The New York Times Book Review).

He currently lives in Sydney, Australia and teaches English at Marcellin College Randwick.

Bibliography

Sources
Granta Magazine author profile

References

1972 births
Living people
21st-century English male writers
21st-century English novelists
Alumni of Newcastle University
Alumni of the University of East Anglia
Alumni of Wadham College, Oxford
English male novelists
Granta people
International Writing Program alumni
People educated at Blundell's School
Writers from Tiverton, Devon